Attorney General Kerr may refer to:

Ewing Thomas Kerr (1900–1992), Attorney General of Wyoming
Duncan Kerr (born 1952), Attorney-General of Australia

See also
General Kerr (disambiguation)